Manchester Academy is a coeducational secondary school within the English Academy programme, in Moss Side, Manchester. It is situated on Moss Lane East (B5219), near Denmark Road, with the University of Manchester nearby to the north and the Whitworth Art Gallery to the east.

History
The Manchester Central Grammar School for Boys was established on Whitworth Street in 1900. While the Central High School for Girls remained at Whitworth Street, the Central High School for Boys moved to Kirkmanshulme Lane in Longsight in 1958. It amalgamated with Victoria Park Secondary School to form the Central High School for Boys (as a comprehensive school) in 1967. It then amalgamated with Ducie Technical College to form the Ducie Central High School for Boys in 1982.

The school moved to Moss Side, where new buildings were built at a cost of £5 million (the old site is now occupied by Belle Vue Centre), in September 1995. Iain Duncan Smith visited the school in October 2002. After a £12 million new building had been completed, the school re-opened under the leadership of Dame Kathryn August as the Manchester Academy in September 2003.

Admissions
It is run by United Learning, a subsidiary of the United Church Schools Trust. Over half of pupils are entitled to free school meals and many are from refugee or non-English speaking backgrounds.

Academic performance
 
In 2009, the Manchester Evening News reported that the school had achieved an 'astounding transformation', with its predecessor once branded 'the worst in the country', it was now rated by Ofsted, the schools inspectorate, as 'outstanding'. The fact that many pupils come from diverse and often economically impoverished backgrounds led experts to state that pupils at the academy performed much better than they would at most other schools.

Awards
Pupils from the academy won the national Apax – Mosaic Enterprise Challenge 2009/10 Award, with their 'virtual business' having generated profits of over £6.3 million online. Attending a ceremony at Atlantic House, London, in March 2010, they were awarded a trophy and a cheque for £3,000 from BBC Dragon's Den and Radio Four Today presenter Evan Davis and Khawar Mann of Apax Partners.

Having won the regional final of the Debate Mate competition, pupils from the academy competed as national finalists in the 2010 Richard Koch Cup Debating Final, chaired by Channel Four's Krishnan Guru-Murthy at the House of Lords.

Notable alumni

Central Grammar School for Boys
 Sir John Alcock, first flight across the Atlantic
 Prof. H. Wright Baker, Professor of Mechanical Engineering from 1939 to 1960 at the University of Manchester
 Joel Barnett, Baron Barnett, Labour MP from 1964 to 1983 for Heywood and Royton
 James Bingham, chairman from 1980 to 1981 of Greater Manchester County Council
 Prof. Eric Boyland, Professor of Biochemistry from 1948 to 1970 at the Institute of Cancer Research, Royal Marsden Hospital, London and expert on molecular toxicology
Prof. Frank W. Cambray, professor and chairman, Geological Sciences, Michigan State University, USA
 Sir George Cartland CMG
 Sir James Chadwick, awarded the Nobel Prize in Physics in 1935 for discovering the neutron
 Sir Alcon Copisarow, Chief Scientific Officer from 1962–64 to the Ministry of Technology
 Prof William Alexander Deer, Vice Chancellor of the University of Cambridge from 1971 to 1973, Master from 1966 to 1975 of Trinity Hall, Cambridge, and Professor of Mineralogy and Petrology from 1961 to 1978
 Robert Donat, actor who won the best actor Oscar in 1939
 Sir William Downward, Lord Lieutenant of Greater Manchester from 1974 to 1987
 Reginald Eastwood, Professor of English Law from 1924 to 1960 at the Victoria University of Manchester
 Prof. Robert Geoffrey Edwards CBE, Professor of Human Reproduction from 1985 to 1989 at the University of Cambridge Nobel Prize for Medicine and inventor, with Patrick Christopher Steptoe, of in vitro fertilisation (IVF) in 1978
 Georg Eisler, painter
 Denis Filer CBE, President from 2000 to 2001 of the IMechE, and Director General from 1988 to 1995 of the Engineering Council
 Rt Rev George Kenneth Giggall OBE, Bishop of St Helena from 1973 to 1979, and Royal Navy chaplain
 Prof. Edward Gregson, composer and Principal from 1996 to 2008 of the Royal Northern College of Music
 Sir Henry Hardman CB, Permanent Secretary from 1963 to 1964 at the Ministry of Defence
 Frank Hatton, local Labour MP from 1973 to 1974 for Manchester Exchange, and from 1974 to 1978 for Manchester Moss Side
 Rabbi Louis Jacobs CBE
 Prof. William Johnson, Professor of Mechanics from 1975 to 1982 at the University of Cambridge, and Professor of Mechanical Engineering from 1960 to 1975 at the University of Manchester
 Sir Leslie Kirkley CBE, Director from 1961 to 1974 of Oxfam, and largely responsible for it, and chairman from 1977 to 1981 of the Disasters Emergency Committee
 Arthur Knowles CBE, Secretary General from 1946 to 1956 of the Association of British Chambers of Commerce
 Kenneth Marks, Labour MP from 1967 to 1983 for Manchester Gorton
 Cecil Melling CBE, President from 1962 to 1963 of the IEE
 Vivian Pereira-Mendoza, Director from 1970 to 1980 of the Polytechnic of the South Bank, and Principal from 1966 to 1970 of the Borough Polytechnic (its predecessor)
 Sir Derek Roberts, Provost from 1989 to 1999 and 2002-03 of University College London (UCL)
 David Rohl
 Benny Rothman, rambler and activist
 Brian Statham CBE, English cricketer (fast bowler). Played for England 1951–65. In 1962 he broke the record held by Alec Bedser for the most wickets taken by an English bowler.
 James L. Tuck, physicist, member of the Manhattan project, shaped explosives expert

Ducie Technical High School for Boys
 Mel Ainscow, Professor of Education at the University of Manchester
 Sir Howard Bernstein, Chief Executive since 1998 of Manchester City Council
 Peter McGarr, composer 
 Lord Monks, trades unionist
 Sir Trefor Morris CBE, Chief Constable from 1984 to 1990 of Hertfordshire Constabulary
 John Thaw, actor.
 George Waring, actor
 Paul Young, singer and percussionist

Other local United Learning Trust schools
 Salford City Academy
 Stockport Academy
 William Hulme's Grammar School

See also
 List of schools in Manchester
 Manchester Central High School in New Hampshire, USA

References

External links
 Manchester Academy website
 History of Central High School
 EduBase

News items
 Improvement in April 2009
 Academy opens in 2003
 Church takes over in May 2002

Academies in Manchester
Secondary schools in Manchester
United Learning schools
Educational institutions established in 2003
2003 establishments in England
.